Jessica Yu-Li Henwick (born 30 August 1992) is a BAFTA nominated English actress, writer and director. She is known for her roles as Nymeria Sand in the HBO series Game of Thrones (2015–2017), X-wing pilot Jessika Pava in the film Star Wars: The Force Awakens (2015), Colleen Wing in the Marvel Television series Iron Fist (2017–2018), and Bugs in the film The Matrix Resurrections (2021).

Early life 
Henwick was born and raised in Surrey, England, the daughter of a Singaporean-Chinese mother of Teochew descent and an English father. Her father, Mark, is an author. She has two brothers, one older and one younger than her. She trained briefly at Redroofs Theatre School and the National Youth Theatre.

Career 
In June 2009, it was announced that Henwick had been cast in the lead role of Bo for the BBC show Spirit Warriors, making her the first actress of East Asian descent to play the lead role in a British television series.

In early 2013, Henwick made her professional theatre debut in the international premiere of Running on the Cracks, based on the book by Julia Donaldson. Allan Radcliffe of The Times praised her "excellent" and "understated" performance, while the Guardian wrote, "with tremendous physical presence, Henwick captures the sense of adolescent righteousness, passion and confusion of a girl trying to create order in an unfair universe." Theatre critic Joyce McMillan wrote that Henwick was "outstanding as Leo".

Later that year she was cast as Jane Jeong Trenka in the drama Obsession: Dark Desires, which aired January 2014. The adaptation details Trenka's stalking in Minnesota, 1991, which she details in her book The Language of Blood. Henwick also joined the cast of Silk as new barrister pupil Amy. The series brought in an average of 5 million viewers per episode. She reprised her role for the spin-off radio series Silk: The Clerks' Room.

In 2015 Henwick joined the cast of the HBO series Game of Thrones in Season 5 as Nymeria Sand. She continued performing the role until Season 7.

Henwick played the X-wing pilot Jess Pava in Star Wars: The Force Awakens. The character's full name is established as Jessika "Testor" Pava in the spin-off novel The Weapon of a Jedi: A Luke Skywalker Adventure. Despite her limited screen time, the character of Pava has become a fan favorite. Pava later appeared as a supporting character in the comic book series Star Wars: Poe Dameron, which ran from 2016 to 2018, and reprised the role for the Lego Star Wars: The Skywalker Saga game.

In 2017, Henwick appeared as Colleen Wing in the Netflix television series Iron Fist. Although critical reception of Iron Fist was generally negative, Henwick's performance in the series was well received. She reprised the role for the series The Defenders, as well as the second season of Luke Cage.

At the end of 2017, Henwick was listed as one of Variety'''s Top Breakout Stars. In 2020, she co-starred in the Fox science fiction thriller Underwater, and the films Love and Monsters and Sofia Coppola's On the Rocks. That same year she was listed as one of The Hollywood Reporter's Rising Stars and won the Brit to Watch award at the Newport Beach Film Festival.

In 2021, she starred in The Matrix Resurrections. IGN called Henwick the "best part of Resurrections", while Deadline Hollywood said she was "what makes the movie worth watching". She was nominated and won Best Supporting Actress on the Gold list Honors for the most outstanding Asian achievements in the film industry.

In 2022, Henwick was in two of the most highly viewed Netflix films of all time, The Gray Man and Glass Onion: A Knives Out Mystery.

 Writing 
In 2020, it was announced Amazon had picked up Nancy Wu Done It'', a young adult series that Henwick co-wrote. She also has a miniseries in development with Emu Films.

In 2022 Henwick wrote an episode for the animated series Moley. Henwick also won the Mary Pickford prize for female filmmaker, for the Xiaomi short film ‘Bus Girl’ that she wrote and directed. The short was nominated for the BAFTA awards in 2023.

Filmography

Film

Television

Video games

Stage

Radio

Short film

Awards and nominations

References

External links

 

Living people
21st-century English actresses
Actresses from Surrey
British actresses of Chinese descent
English people of Chinese descent
English people of Singaporean descent
English people of Zambian descent
English child actresses
English martial artists
National Youth Theatre members
People educated at Redroofs Theatre School
1992 births